Eduardo Andres Lucio Jr. (born January 20, 1946) is a Democratic politician who served in the Texas Senate, representing the 27th District from 1991 to 2023. Lucio also previously served in the  Texas House of Representatives from 1987 to 1991.

Career
Lucio is the Chairman of the Intergovernmental Relations Committee. He also sits on the Committees on Natural Resources & Economic Development, Veterans Affairs & Military Installations, the Subcommittee on Border Security, and serves as Vice Chairman of Senate Education Committee. He also created and sits on the Interagency Tasks Force on Children with Special Needs.

Eddie Lucio began his public service in 1971, becoming Cameron County Treasurer and later Cameron County commissioner.

He authored legislation creating the Regional Academic Health Center (RAHC) and he worked for passage of a bill during the 81st legislative session that creates the University of Texas Health Science Center - South Texas to serve Cameron, Hidalgo, Starr, Willacy, Brooks, Jim Hogg, Kenedy, Kleberg, and Zapata counties with a full-fledged medical school.

Lucio has worked to establish the partnership between the University of Texas at Brownsville and Texas Southmost College which allows UTB to become a four-year university and have access to the Permanent University Fund. Additionally, he authored the bill to create South Texas Community College.

Lucio was the only Democrat in the Texas Senate to support the 2013 legislation to restrict abortions to twenty weeks of gestation and to require abortions be performed in surgical centers. Lucio also authored legislation to require that women receiving abortions and physicians performing them take a free adoption awareness course. He described himself as "pro-life" and was endorsed and supported by Democrats for Life of America, a "pro-life" or anti-abortion movement PAC.

During the 78th legislative session, Lucio was elected by his colleagues as Senate President Pro Tempore.

On November 3, 2021, Lucio announced that he would not be running for reelection.

Personal life
Lucio is the father of Eddie Lucio III, who serves in the Texas House of Representatives. His dad is Eduardo Lucio. He was born and raised in Brownsville, Texas.

Electoral history

2020

2016

2012

2008

2004

2002

2000

1996

1994

1992

References

External links
Senate of Texas - Eddie Lucio official TX website
Project Vote Smart - Senator Eddie Lucio Jr. (TX) profile
Follow the Money - Eddie Lucio Jr.
2006 2004 2002 campaign contributions

1946 births
Living people
Presidents pro tempore of the Texas Senate
Democratic Party Texas state senators
Democratic Party members of the Texas House of Representatives
People from Brownsville, Texas
21st-century American politicians